Papilio oribazus is a swallowtail butterfly from the genus Papilio that is found in eastern Madagascar. The species was first described by Jean Baptiste Boisduval in 1836. The habitat consists of forests and forest margins.

Taxonomy
Papilio oribazus is the nominal member of the oribazus species group. The clade members are:
Papilio oribazus Boisduval, 1836
Papilio epiphorbas Boisduval, 1833
Papilio nobilis Rogenhofer, 1891

References

External links
"Papilio oribazus Boisduval, 1836". Insecta.pro. With images.

oribazus
Butterflies described in 1836
Butterflies of Africa
Taxa named by Jean Baptiste Boisduval
Lepidoptera of Madagascar
Endemic fauna of Madagascar